The 17th Independent Spirit Awards, honoring the best in independent filmmaking for 2001, were announced on March 23, 2002.  It was hosted by John Waters.

Winners and nominees

Special awards

John Cassavetes Award
Jackpot
Acts of Worship
Kaaterskill Falls
Punks
Virgil Bliss

Truer Than Fiction Award
Hybrid
Children Underground
The Mark of Cain
Promises
Trembling Before G-d

Producers Award
Rene Bastian and Linda Moran – Martin & Orloff and L.I.E.
Adrienne Gruben – Treasure Island and Olympia
Jasmine Kosovic – Just One Time and The Adventures of Sebastian Cole
Nadia Leonelli – Acts of Worship and Perfume

Someone to Watch Award
Debra Eisenstadt – Daydream Believer
DeMane Davis and Khari Streeter – Lift
Michael Gilio – Kwik Stop
David Maquiling – Too Much Sleep

Films with multiple nominations and awards

Films that received multiple nominations

Films that won multiple awards

References

External links 
2001 Spirit Awards at IMDb
Official ceremony on YouTube

2001
Independent Spirit Awards